Sivakasi Municipal corporation is the civic body governing city of Sivakasi in Indian state of Tamil Nadu. Municipal Corporation mechanism in India was introduced during British Rule with formation of municipal corporation in Madras (Chennai) in 1688, later followed by municipal corporations in Bombay (Mumbai) and Calcutta (Kolkata) by 1762. Sivakasi Municipal Corporation is headed by Mayor of city and governed by Commissioner.

History and administration 

Sivakasi Municipal Corporation in Virudhunagar district was formed in year 2021 and is one of the 21 municipal corporations in Tamil Nadu. The place is known majorly for manufacturing fire crackers.

Sivakasi Municipal Corporation a Commissioner Mayor, a Council, a Standing Committee, a Wards Committee for facilitating various works.

Factors driving Sivakasi Municipal Corporation 

Sivakasi Municipal Corporation is driven by following factors:

  Population Growth.
  Increase in annual Income.
  Improvement of Roads.
  Providing drinking water.
  Improving landscape.
  Improving employment opportunities.
  Improving relations between police and public.
  Waste Management.
  Arranging facilities during natural calamities.
  Establishing industrial units.
  Providing sewage connection.

Sivakasi Municipal Corporation local body polls 

Sivakasi Municipal Corporation will get a mayor and municipal council through local body polls.

See also 
 List of municipal corporations in India

References

External links 
 official website

Municipal corporations in Tamil Nadu
Virudhunagar district